Southcott is a hamlet southwest of Jacobstow in north Cornwall, United Kingdom. 

It consists of Higher, Middle and Lower Southcott. Higher Southcott now completely borders Jacobstow and Lower Southcott borders another small hamlet named Kent. At the 2011 census population details were included in the civil parish of Jacobstow.

References

External links

Hamlets in Cornwall